Sada Carolyn Thompson (September 27, 1927 – May 4, 2011) was an American stage, film, and television actress. She was known to television audiences as Kate Lawrence in Family (1976-1980).

Life and career
She was born Sada Carolyn Thompson in Des Moines, Iowa, in 1927 to Hugh Woodruff Thompson and his wife Corlyss (née Gibson). The family moved to Fanwood, New Jersey a few years later.<ref name=AM>Sada Thompson. AllMovie.</ref> where she attended Scotch Plains-Fanwood High School, graduating in the class of 1945. Thompson earned a Bachelor of Fine Arts in Theatre at the Carnegie Institute of Technology (now known as Carnegie Mellon University), after which she worked steadily in regional theatre in such plays as The Seagull, Pygmalion, Our Town, Arms and the Man, and Blithe Spirit. She received training at Pittsburgh Playhouse, where she appeared in numerous productions.

She made her Off-Broadway debut in a 1955 production of Under Milkwood, and the following year she appeared on television in a Goodyear Television Playhouse production. She made her Broadway debut in the 1959 musical Juno. Her additional New York City stage-credits include The Effect of Gamma Rays on Man-in-the-Moon Marigolds, Tartuffe, and Twigs. Her stage performances won her an Obie Award, a Tony Award for Best Performance by a Leading Actress in a Play (for "Twigs"), three Drama Desk Awards and two Sarah Siddons Awards (the last presented for outstanding performances in Chicago theatre). She was elected to the American Theater Hall of Fame in 2005.

On the strength of her success in Twigs, Thompson was signed to play neighbor Irene Lorenzo on All in the Family.  After taping her first episode, however, she was replaced by Betty Garrett, when it became obvious that she and producer Norman Lear had different opinions about how the character should be played.

She was subsequently cast as matriarch Kate Lawrence on Family. Thompson's portrayal of Kate was lauded for its realism. She won the 1978 Emmy Award for Outstanding Lead Actress in a Drama Series for the role, which also garnered three nominations for the Golden Globe Award for Best Actress in a Television Series Drama.

She was nominated for the Emmy Award nine times, including a nomination for her portrayal of Carla's mother on Cheers. Thompson's additional television credits included Owen Marshall: Counselor at Law, The Love Boat, Father Dowling Mysteries, Andre's Mother, Indictment: The McMartin Trial, ER and Law & Order. Her feature films included The Pursuit of Happiness, Desperate Characters, and Pollock''.

Personal life
Thompson was married to Donald E. Stewart from December 18, 1949, until her death. She and her husband lived in Southbury, Connecticut. Their daughter, Liza Stewart, is a costume designer.

Death
Thompson died on May 4, 2011, in Danbury, Connecticut, of lung disease, aged 83.

Filmography

Film

Television

Awards and nominations

References

External links
 
 
 

1927 births
2011 deaths
Actresses from New Jersey
American stage actresses
American film actresses
American television actresses
Drama Desk Award winners
Outstanding Performance by a Lead Actress in a Drama Series Primetime Emmy Award winners
Obie Award recipients
Tony Award winners
Actresses from Des Moines, Iowa
Deaths from lung disease
People from Southbury, Connecticut
Carnegie Mellon University College of Fine Arts alumni
20th-century American actresses
People from Fanwood, New Jersey
Scotch Plains-Fanwood High School alumni